Rose Bella (born 5 May 1994) is a Cameroonian footballer who plays as a forward for the Turkish club ALG Spor and the Cameroon women's national team.

Club career 
Bella has played for AS Police in Cameroon and for Malabo Kings in Equatorial Guinea.

In 2021, she moved to Turkey and signed with the re-established team Trabzonspor to play in the Turkish Women's Football Super League.

On 5 August 2022, she transferred to the Gaziantep-based league champion club ALG Spor. On 18 August 2022, she debuted in the 2022–23 UEFA Women's Champions League.

International career 
Bella was part of the Cameroon women's national football team at the 2015 FIFA Women's World Cup.

Career statistics 
.

References

External links 
 

1994 births
Living people
Place of birth missing (living people)
Cameroonian women's footballers
Women's association football forwards
Cameroon women's international footballers
2015 FIFA Women's World Cup players
Cameroonian expatriate women's footballers
Cameroonian expatriate sportspeople in Equatorial Guinea
Expatriate women's footballers in Equatorial Guinea
Expatriate women's footballers in Turkey
Cameroonian expatriate sportspeople in Turkey
Turkish Women's Football Super League players
Trabzonspor women's players
ALG Spor players